The Freiheitshalle is a building in Hof, Bavaria, Germany.

Artists that have performed at the venue include Peter Maffay, Glenn Miller Orchestra, AC/DC, Queen, The Cross, Florian Silbereisen and Hofer Symphoniker, among others.

External links
 Freiheitshalle Hof

Buildings and structures in Hof, Bavaria